The Popular Union of Equatorial Guinea is a political party in the Equatorial Guinea. It is led by Daniel Martinez Ayecaba. The party was originally banned by the ruling Democratic Party of Equatorial Guinea, the ruling party since 1987, but was legalized in May 1992.

The UP's candidate, Archivaldo Montelo Biribé gained 0.34% of the country's vote in the 2009 Equatoguinean presidential election. The party did not participate in the 2016 election.

Electoral history

Presidential elections

References

Political parties in Equatorial Guinea
Political parties established in 1988
Christian democratic parties in Africa